The 1985–86 Montreal Canadiens season was the team's 77th season. The team won the Stanley Cup for the first time in seven seasons, and their 23rd overall.

Offseason

Regular season

Final standings

Schedule and results

Player statistics

Regular season
Scoring

Goaltending

Playoffs
Scoring

Goaltending

Playoffs

Stanley Cup

Calgary Flames vs. Montreal Canadiens

Montreal wins the series 4–1.

Awards and records
 Kjell Dahlin, rookie scoring leader, 71 points
 Kjell Dahlin, NHL All-Rookie Team
 Mats Naslund, NHL Second Team All-Star
 Patrick Roy, Conn Smythe Trophy
 Patrick Roy, NHL All-Rookie Team

Transactions

1986 Montreal Canadiens Stanley Cup Champions
Bob Gainey, Doug Soetaert, Patrick Roy, Rick Green, David Maley, Ryan Walter, Serge Boisvert, Mario Tremblay, Bobby Smith, Craig Ludwig, Tom Kurvers, Kjell Dahlin, Larry Robinson, Guy Carbonneau, Chris Chelios, Petr Svoboda, Mats Naslund, Lucien DeBlois, Steve Rooney, Gaston Gingras, Mike Lalor, Chris Nilan, John Kordic, Claude Lemieux, Mike McPhee, Brian Skrudland, Stephane Richer, Serge Savard (general manager), Jean Perron (coach), Jacques Laperriere (assistant coach), Eddy Palchak (trainer).

Draft picks
Montreal's draft picks at the 1985 NHL Entry Draft held at the Metro Toronto Convention Centre in Toronto, Ontario.

Farm teams

See also
 1985–86 NHL season

References
 Canadiens on Hockey Database
 Canadiens on NHL Reference

Stanley Cup championship seasons
Montreal Canadiens seasons
Montreal Canadiens season, 1985-86
Montreal Canadiens season, 1985-86
Eastern Conference (NHL) championship seasons
Montreal